In a Car is the Meat Puppets' first recording. It was originally issued on L.A. art collective/record label World Imitation records as a 5-track 7-inch EP.

It was recorded in Silver Lake studio in Los Angeles on June 4, 1981, with Ed Barger (who had engineered several early Devo singles). It was recorded in about 12 hours. In a Car was first re-issued as a 7-inch on SST Records in 1985 after the success of their early LPs. The EP was also included on an SST compilation cassette (and later CD) "The 7 Inch Wonders of the World."

While the original EP contained only five tracks, six tracks were recorded at the session, including the song "Hair," written by fellow World Imitation band Monitor. It was released as a lone Meat Puppets track on the first Monitor LP on World Imitation records. It was not on any Meat Puppets release until Rykodisc issued the song as a bonus track (with the entire first EP and many outtakes) on the 1999 reissue of the first LP, Meat Puppets.

Critical reception
Trouser Press called the recording "shrieking thrash-punk and unrealized avant-guitar ambitions." Spin called it "tunefully abrasive."

Track listing
All songs written by Meat Puppets.

"In a Car" – 1:21
"Big House" – 1:07
"Dolphin Field" – 1:09
"Out in the Gardener" – 1:04
"Foreign Lawns" – 0:37

References

Meat Puppets albums
1981 EPs